Interactional linguistics (IL) is an interdisciplinary approach to grammar and interaction in the field of linguistics, that applies the methods of Conversation Analysis to the study of linguistic structures, including syntax, phonetics, phonology, morphology, semantics, pragmatics, and so on. Interactional linguistics is based on the principle that linguistic structures and uses are formed through interaction and it aims at understanding how languages are shaped through interaction. The approach focuses on temporality, activity implication and embodiment in interaction. Interactional linguistics asks research questions such as "How are linguistic patterns shaped by interaction?" and "How do linguistic patterns themselves shape interaction?".

History
Interactional linguistics is partly a development within conversation analysis focusing on linguistic research questions, partly a development of Emergent grammar or West Coast functional grammar. The two approaches can be seen as effectively merged into interactional linguistics, but also with interactional sociolinguistics.

Conversation analysis
While conversation analysis did indeed study language since its beginning, it grew out of sociology and often dealt with sociological research questions and topics. However, over time linguists adopted the ideas and methods from conversation analysis for linguistic research questions, and thereby framed conversation analytic insights as a new understanding of linguistic structure in opposition to other linguistic theories. Some early uses of the term Interactional Linguistics are found in the title of a 1995 conference with the title and 2000 conference Interactional Linguistics: Euro-conference on the Linguistic Organisation of Conversational Activities and in the 2001 book Studies in Interactional Linguistics by Elizabeth Couper-Kuhlen and Margret Selting. They mark a development that most clearly took place in the 90s through the publication of various edited volumes - most importantly the book Interaction and Grammar edited by Elinor Ochs, Emanuel Schegloff and Sandra Thompson.

While there is no agreed-upon delineation between the two, interactional linguistics is characterized by looking at linguistic structures and employing linguistic terminology for its description of what interactants orient to (and not only looking at e.g. gesture). It goes against earlier approaches where research was focused on investigating written language. With the improvement of technology, linguists have started to focus on spoken language as well due to its functions in intonation and transcription system. Starting to investigate spoken language on its own is the start of interactional linguistics’ development. Afterward, function-directed linguists were working on relations between discourse function and linguistic form. Though the functional linguistic study was not all about conversational interaction, it was really helpful for the language study which saw linguistic form as being useful on the situated occasion of use. The next step which made interactional linguistics develop was the important work on conversation analysis. Some sociologists were saying the study of everyday language was the essence of social order; some other kinds of discourse were said to be understood as habituations of the fundamental conversational order. The term talk-in-interaction was created as an inclusive term for all of naturally speech exchange.

Emergent grammar and West Coast functional grammar
Emergent grammar was proposed by Paul Hopper and postulates that rules of grammar come about as language is spoken and used. This is contrary to the a priori grammar postulate, the idea that grammar rules exist in the mind before the production of utterances. Compared to the principles of generative grammar and the concept of Universal Grammar, interactional linguistics asserts that grammar emerges from social interaction. Whereas Universal Grammar claims that features of grammar are innate, emergent grammar and other interactional theories claim that the human language faculty has no innate grammar and that features of grammar are learned through experience and social interaction.

Different approaches
Interactional linguistics has developed in linguistic discourse analysis and conversation analysis, and is used to investigate the relationship between grammatical structure and real-time interaction and language use. Further, the topic of normativity in a discourse or a social norm both contribute to how a conversation functions. There is a common ground that both parties in a conversation use in order to determine how to both continue a conversation and what sort of social syntax to use. For example, if two workers were speaking together, the interaction between them would be different, more informal, compared to how a worker and their boss might interact in a more formal manner.

Scholars in interactional linguistics draw from functional linguistics, conversation analysis, and linguistic anthropology in order to describe "the way in which language figures in everyday interaction and cognition" and Interactional Linguistics may be considered an usage-based approach to language. Studies in interactional linguistics view linguistic forms, including syntactic and prosodic structures, as greatly affected by interactions among participants in speech, signing, or other language use. The field contrasts with dominant approaches to linguistics during the twentieth century, which tended to focus either on the form of language per se, or on theories of individual language user's linguistic competence. Various scholars have or are attempting to write grammar books from an interactional linguistic perspective, for languages such as Alto Perené and Danish (See Samtalegrammatik.dk).

References

Further reading

Interactional Linguistics (John Benjamins journal)

Discourse analysis
Grammar frameworks
Grammar
Syntax
Phonology
Emergence